The Grumman AF Guardian is the first purpose-built anti-submarine warfare (ASW) carrier-based aircraft to enter service with the United States Navy. It consisted of two airframe variants, one for detection gear, the other for weapons. The Guardian remained in service until August 1955, when it was replaced by the twin-engined Grumman S-2 Tracker. The Guardian was the largest single-engine piston-powered carrier aircraft ever to see service.

Design and development

The original design concept for the aircraft that would become the Guardian, the XTB2F of 1944, was for a twin-engined aircraft with a  warload and a range of 3,700 mi (5,950 km).

However, this too was considered impractical, and another alternative, the internally developed Grumman Model G-70, was selected instead, being given the Navy designation XTB3F-1. This was designed as mixed-power aircraft, with a Pratt & Whitney Double Wasp radial engine in the nose and a Westinghouse 19XB (J30) turbojet in the tail. Originally, the Westinghouse engine was to be the new X24C, which was to emerge as the J34. When it became apparent the X24C delivery schedules would not meet the airframe schedule, the 19XB-2B was substituted. This was found to be unsuitable, and the jet engine was removed without ever having been used in flight. The XTB3F-1S carried a crew of two seated side by side and an armament of two 20 mm cannon and 4,000 lb (1,814 kg) of bombs, torpedoes and/or rockets, and made its first flight on 19 December 1945.

On 24 December 1945, the Navy changed the role of the aircraft from torpedo-bomber to anti-submarine warfare. All the required equipment could not be fitted into a single aircraft, consequently two variants would be produced, one as a "guppy" (hunter) and another as a "scrapper" (killer). The hunter aircraft would not carry any armament, but instead two additional crew members and a ventral radome for AN/APS-20 search radar and electronic countermeasures (ECM) consisting of an AN/APR-98 countermeasures receiver and AN/AP-70 bearing indicator. This aircraft, the XTB3F-1S, first flew in November 1948. The "killer" deleted the cannon of the torpedo bomber, but retained the bomb bay, added a third crewmember, a searchlight, and short-range radar, and (as the XTB3F-2S) first flew in January 1949.

Operational history

Redesignated as AF-2W (TB3F-1S) and AF-2S (TB3F-2S), the Guardian entered fleet service on 27 September 1950 with three aircraft delivered to VS-24, with full service introduction shortly after with VS-25. A total of 193 AF-2S Guardians were built. In 1952, the AF-3S (hunter) was introduced, fitting a magnetic anomaly detector (MAD) for the detection of submerged submarines; 40 of this variant were built. The last Guardian was delivered to the Navy in March 1953, with a total of 389 built.

The Guardian saw service in the maritime patrol role during the Korean War, however it proved unpopular with pilots, being underpowered and heavy on the controls; the aircraft suffered from a severely high accident rate. Shortly after the end of the war, it began to be replaced by the Grumman S2F Tracker, the U.S. Navy first purpose-built ASW airplane to combine the hunter and killer roles in a single airframe. The last AF retired from active service on 31 August 1955, but it remained in service with the US Naval Air Reserve until 1957.

Variants

 XTB3F-1
Prototypes of two-seat torpedo bomber powered by one 2,300 hp R-2800-46 engine and a Westinghouse turbojet; three built.
 XTB3F-1S & -2S
Two modified XTB3F-1 prototypes with turbojet removed and ventral radome, later redesignated as XAF-1.
 AF-2S
Production variant with 2,400 hp R-2800-48 engine, 193 built.
 AF-2W
Hunter variant with search radar in a ventral radome, 153 built.
 AF-3S
Hunter/Killer variant similar to AF-2S with retractable MAD boom, 40 built.
 Grumman Model G-90
 Proposed combined AF-2S/-2W version, cancelled.

Operators

 United States Navy
 Aero Union

Surviving aircraft

After disposal by the U.S. Navy five Guardians saw many years service with Aero Union based at Chico, California, in the forest firefighting role, the last being retired in 1978.
On display
AF-2S
123100 – National Naval Aviation Museum at NAS Pensacola in Pensacola, Florida. It was the seventh AF-2S produced. The aircraft was operated as a firefighter until 1978. It was acquired by the museum in 1980. It is displayed in the colors of its first Navy assignment, though still carries the number "30" on the cowling, which for many years was the aircraft's call-sign as a firefighting aircraft;
129233 – Pima Air and Space Museum, Tucson, Arizona.  This aircraft is displayed as it appeared while serving as an aerial firefighter with Aero Union in California.  During this period the distinctive empennage with twin vertical stabilizers on each horizontal tail were removed to make a more conventional appearance.
126731 – Static display at the Commemorative Air Force's facility in Mesa, Arizona, as a memorial to VAdm James B. Stockdale, who flew this aircraft early in his Navy career.126731

Specifications (AF-2S Guardian)

See also

References

Notes and Citations

Bibliography
 Donald, David and Daniel J. March. Carrier Aviation Air Power Directory. Norwalk, CT: AIRtime Publishing, 2001. .
 Goodall, Geoffrey. Warbirds Directory. Victoria, Australia: Victoria Publishing, Fourth Edition 2005.
 Gunston, Bill. Grumman: Sixty Years of Excellence. New York: Orion Books, 1988. .
 Kowalski, Robert J. Grumman AF Guardian. Naval Fighters Series (#20). Simi Valley, CA: Steve Ginter Publishing, 1991, .
 Pilot's Manual for Navy Model AF-2S Aircraft, AN 01-85DAB-1. Washington: Secretary of the Air Force and the Bureau of Aeronautics, 4 March 1951; reissued in digital DVD version as Grumman AF-2S Flight Manual, AN 01-85DAB-1, 1951. Richmond Hill, Ontario, Canada: Sicuro Publishing Inc., 2011.
 Salerno, Giorgio. Hand-in-Hand: US Navy 'Hunter-Killer' Anti-Sub Teams. Air Enthusiast 111, May/June 2004, pp. 32–37. 
 Swanborough, Gordon and Peter M. Bowers. United States Navy Aircraft since 1911. London: Putnam, Second edition, 1976. .
 Swanborough, Gordon and Peter M. Bowers. United States Navy Aircraft since 1911. London: Putnam, Third edition, 1990. .
 Thruelsen, Richard. The Grumman Story. New York: Praeger Publishers, Inc., 1976. .
 Wagner, Ray. American Combat Planes. New York: Doubleday & Company, Third Edition, 1982. .

External links

 (1951) AN 01-85DAB-1 Pilot's Handbook for Navy Model AF-2S Aircraft
 Grumman AF Guardian at Greg Goebel's Air Vectors
 AF2S Guardian at Arizona Wing Commemorative Air Force

A01F Guardian
1940s United States anti-submarine aircraft
Single-engined tractor aircraft
Carrier-based aircraft
Mid-wing aircraft
Aircraft first flown in 1945